The elm cultivar Ulmus 'Myrtifolia', the Myrtle-leaved Elm, first appeared in nursery and horticultural lists from the 1830s, as Ulmus myrtifolia and Ulmus campestris myrtifolia, the name Ulmus myrtifolia Volxem being used at Kew Gardens from 1880. Lawson's nursery of Edinburgh appears to have been the earliest to list the tree. 'Myrtifolia' was listed by Nicholson in Kew Hand-List Trees & Shrubs (1896), but without description. It was later listed as a cultivar and described by Rehder in 1939 and by Krüssmann in 1962. 

The specimen under this name in the Herb. Nicholson at Kew was considered by Melville to be a probable U. minor × Ulmus minor 'Plotii' hybrid.

The cultivar 'Myrtifolia Purpurea', which has larger leaves, is not related to 'Myrtifolia'.

Description
'Myrtifolia' was described as having leaves ovate or rhombic-ovate to oblong-ovate, 2–5 cm long with nearly simple teeth, loosely pilose on both sides. The petiole is 2 to 4 mm long, the samarae 12 to 15 mm long.

Cultivation
A 'Mytifolia' was present in North Road, Bath in 1902. There were specimens at Arnold Arboretum in the mid-20th century, sourced in the 1920s from a tree in Cleveland, Ohio.

The tree is not known to remain in cultivation.

Putative specimen
A small, slow-growing, dense-crowned old elm (15 m, girth 2 m), with very small narrow myrtle-like leaves, stands near 90 Lower Granton Rd, Edinburgh (2016), in a garden that was once part of the elm-planted grounds of Wardie House (demolished 1955). Ulmus campestris myrtifolia appeared in the lists of the adjacent Wardie Nursery (Lawson Nursery group) in the late 19th century, and Ulmus myrtifolia in the Lawson's of Edinburgh lists from the 1830s. Its leaves, which flush and fall late, are lance-shaped or oval (2–4.5 cm by 1.3–2 cm; petioles 0.5–1 cm). The tree, which has smooth branchlets, has been grafted on to a suberose U. minor stock.

Synonymy
Ulmus campestris (: minor) var. myrtifolia Hort.: Nicholson, in Kew Hand-List Trees & Shrubs 2: 135, 1896.
Ulmus buxifolia Hort.: Nicholson, Kew Hand-List Trees & Shrubs 2: 135, 1896, in synonymy.
Ulmus procera var. myrtifolia: Bean (1934) 
Ulmus procera f. myrtifolia: Rehder (1939)

References

External links
 Ulmus Myrtifolia, systematics.mortonarb.org

Elm cultivars
Ulmus articles missing images
Ulmus
Granton, Edinburgh